Dionysos is a north suburb of Athens and a municipality in northeastern Attica, Greece. The seat of the municipality is the town Agios Stefanos.

Geography

Dionysos is situated on the northeastern slopes of the forested Penteliko Mountains. It is 5 km south of Agios Stefanos, 9 km west of Nea Makri, on the Aegean Sea coast, and 18 km northeast of Athens city centre. Its built-up area is continuous with those of the neighbouring suburbs Drosia and Rodopoli to the northwest. Even though the town is located only 20 Kilometres away from central Athens, it has a completely different climate, with weather being significantly cooler, including frequent snowfall during the winter. 
Motorway 1 (Athens - Lamia - Thessaloniki) and the railway from Athens to Thessaloniki pass through the western part of the municipality, near Agios Stefanos. There is a railway station at Agios Stefanos. Dionysos is connected to Kifisia by the 536 Dionysos-Kifisia bus service.

Climate

Dionysos has a hot-summer Mediterranean climate (Köppen climate classification: Csa). Thrakomakedones experiences hot, relatively dry summers and cool, wet winters.

History

The town was known by the Arvanitika name Tzamali (Τζαμάλη) up until 1928 when it was renamed Dionysos. The sanctuary of Dionysus of Icaria was rediscovered by archaeology in 1888.

Culture
Dionysos hosts an annual open summer festival usually every July, featuring art exhibitions, theatrical performances, musical shows, sculpture painting and other arts. The public library of Dionysos is located in the town hall, includes over 3500 books available to registered residents to borrow for free. It is run by local volunteers.

Municipality
The municipality Dionysos was formed at the 2011 local government reform by the merger of the following 7 former municipalities, that became municipal units:
Agios Stefanos
Anoixi
Dionysos
Drosia
Kryoneri
Rodopoli
Stamata

The municipality has an area of 69.360 km2, the municipal unit 21.410 km2.

Notable people
 Thespis, (6th century BC) actor
 Kostas Martakis, singer 
 Aristi Tsipras, mother of the former Greek prime minister Alexis Tsipras

Gallery

See also
List of municipalities of Attica

References

External links
Municipality of Dionysos
 White Marble of Dionissos-Penteli - greekmarble.com

Dionyssomarble group (Dionyssos - Pentelikon marble quarries)
 Dionissos White

 
Populated places in East Attica
Municipalities of Attica

el:Δήμος Διονύσου